White Inch was an island lying in the estuarine waters of the River Clyde close to Glasgow in the Parish of Govan, Lanarkshire, Scotland. Due to the deliberate disposal of dredged material from the Clyde, it became physically part of the northern, Lanarkshire side, of the river bank from the 1830s and is now entirely built over. The name lives on in the Whiteinch district of Glasgow, street names, etc., and probably relates to white colored sand deposits.

Islands in the River Clyde
 
Islands of the River Clyde, rather than sand or mud banks only exposed at low water, once included in the order, working upstream towards Glasgow:- Milton, Bodinbo, Newshot, Ron, Sand Inch, Kings Inch, Buck Inch, White Inch, and Water Inch. A Colin's Isle also once sat in the waters of the Cart near its confluence with the River Clyde.

The name 'Inch' is Scots deriving from the Gaelic 'Innis', an island. The name 'Ron' in Scots refers to  a thicket of hawthorns or rose briers, an area of stunted and crowded woodland. Buck Inch may translate as a place where the sound of pouring or gushing water was heard.

White Inch
Circa 1636-52 Gordon's map shows White Inch and the other islands without recording the name. Prior to 1732 the island is clearly shown in the Clyde on Herman Moll's map with Water Inch upstream and Buck Inch downstream. Roy's map of circa 1747 does not clearly indicate an island, but Whiteinch farm is shown as is a road running east–west. James Barry's 1758 plan of the Clyde names White Inch and shows it as an island.

It lay opposite the old Linthouse Estate and between the River Kelvin and the Whiteinch Burn.

Dredging of the Clyde

The development of Glasgow as a port necessitated the deepening of the River Clyde and the removal of obstacles such as hard gravel at the Marlin Ford, etc. Dredging works produced large volumes of rocks, silt and so on that had to be disposed of as cheaply as possible. James Smith of Jordanhill owned the lands of Jordanvale and White Inch. As an experienced businessman, he struck a mutually beneficial deal with the Clyde Trust, that involved them, at a negligible cost, discarding the silt, etc. from the dredging operations into the river channel on the northern side of the island and onto the low land between Jordanvale and White Inch.

As a result, in the 1830s, White Inch ceased to be an island even during average floods.

The site of the island was used for shipyards and is now completely covered by industrial buildings.

The ford
When the Linthouse Shipyard was constructing new berths in 1913 stones were found in the Clyde and when inspected by the Old Govan Club it was concluded that they were remains of the stepping stones of the ford that once crossed from the south bank of the river. The stones ran to White Inch and then continued to the north bank.

The Course of the River Clyde
The Clyde flooded in the 17th century and its course altered as recorded in the 'First Statistical Account' states that the river "left its usual course, nearly opposite to Scotstoun, took a semi-circular direction, leaving the King’s Inch on the north side, and running along the bottom of the garden belonging to the manse, came into its present direction". This suggests that the River Clyde's main current may have reduced at the White Inch's northern channel.

Paisley Abbey

Circa 1168 thirteen monks from Much Wenlock arrived at Renfrew and were lodged at Steward's castle on King's Inch at a church dedicated to Saints Mary and James. The accommodation at Paisley Abbey was not ready for them at the time. Osbert was appointed as the prior.

The monks had trading rights in the area and fishing rights on the River Clyde. By the year 1172, the monks had moved to Paisley Abbey. Walter Fitz Alan gave King's Inch and all the fishings on the Clyde between the island and Partick to the abbey.

See also

 Bodinbo Island
 Donald's Quay
 Inchview
 King's Inch
 Milton Island
 Newshot Island
 Park Quay
 Rashielee Quay
 St Patrick's Rock

References
Notes 

Sources

Leighton, John (1840). Strath-Clutha or the Beauties of Clyde. Glasgow:Joseph Swan.
Metcalfe, W.D. (1905). A History of the County of Renfrew from the Earliest Times. Paisley : Alexander Gardner. 
Moore, John (2017). The Clyde. Mapping the River. Edinburgh : Birlinn Ltd..
Sweeney, Dan (2015). Postscript to the Past. Lost Mansions and Houses of Renfrewshire. Windsor Press. .

External links
Park Quay ship graveyard near Erskine

Lanarkshire
River islands of Scotland
Islands of the Clyde
River Clyde
Clyde
Clyde
Clyde
Firth of Clyde
Govan
Partick
Former islands of Scotland